Free-Staters was the name given to settlers in Kansas Territory during the "Bleeding Kansas" period in the 1850s who opposed the expansion of slavery. The name derives from the term "free state", that is, a U.S. state without slavery. Many of the "free-staters" joined the Jayhawkers in their fight against slavery and to make Kansas a free state.

Overview
Many Free-Staters were abolitionists from New England, in part because there was an organized emigration of settlers to Kansas Territory arranged by the New England Emigrant Aid Company beginning in 1854.  Other Free-Staters were abolitionists who came to Kansas Territory from Ohio, Iowa, and other midwestern states.  Holton, Kansas was named for the Milwaukee, Wisconsin free-stater Edward Dwight Holton.
What united the Free-Staters was a desire to defeat the southern, pro-slavery settlers in Kansas Territory on the question of whether Kansas would be admitted to the Union as a slave state. (The Kansas–Nebraska Act of 1854 had left the question open to the settlers in the territory.) Bastions for the free-state movement in Kansas included major towns and cities like Lawrence, Eudora, Baldwin City, Osawatomie, Ozawkie, Burlingame, Mound City and Topeka, among others.

As time passed and the violence in Bleeding Kansas escalated, the Free-State movement became more popular. In 1858, the Free-Staters proposed a second constitution, the Leavenworth Constitution, which banned slavery and also would have given the right to vote to black men, though this constitution also failed because the US Senate did not ratify it. Kansas became a state January 29, 1861 after a free state constitution (from a conference in Wyandotte in 1859) was adopted. The Confederate States of America seceded in the next month and Jefferson Davis was sworn in as their president February 18, 1861.

During this campaign both for and against the 2022 Kansas Value Them Both Amendment, a failed ballot initiative which would have removed abortion rights from the Kansas Constitution, Kansas's history as a "free state", or a "beacon of liberty within the region," was brought up by various commentators.

See also
 Santa Fe Trail (film)

References

Further reading
 
 
 

Bleeding Kansas
Abolitionism in the United States
Politically motivated migrations